Hermann Matern (17 June 1893 in Burg bei Magdeburg – 24 January 1971 in Berlin) was a German communist politician (KPD) and high ranking functionary of the Socialist Unity Party of Germany and statesman in the German Democratic Republic.

Life and early career

Early political activities 
Matern was the son of a social democratic worker and himself worked as a tanner. He joined the Socialist Youth Workers and later the Social Democratic Party of Germany in 1911. He later resigned from the SPD when the party accepted war loans. During the first World War he served as a soldier in France.

In 1918, he joined the Independent Social Democratic Party (USPD) and was a participant in the November Revolution and a member of the Workers' and Soldiers' Council  Here he was elected commander of the guard regiment in Magdeburg. From 1919 to 1926 he worked as a tanner in Burg, became a member of the KPD and became KPD chairman in Burg, works council chairman, honorary city council and from 1926 to 1928 KPD trade union secretary. He was a member of the Gau Board and the Reich Tariff Commission of the German Leather Workers' Association. From 1928 to 1929 he attended the International Lenin School in Moscow and was then political leader of the KPD in Magdeburg for Magdeburg-Anhalt until 1931 and then until 1933 political leader of the East Prussia district. In the years 1932 and 1933 he was a member of the Prussian state parliament.

Arrest and exile 
After the rise of the Nazi regime, Matern was arrested in 1933. In September 1934 he managed to escape from the Stettin-Altdamm prison. He emigrated to Czechoslovakia, then via Switzerland to France. It was here in 1935 that he met his future wife Jenny, who followed him from then on and also became a politician. In the Lutetia district (1935 to 1936) he was involved in the attempt to create a popular front against the Nazi regime. His escape took him via Belgium to the Netherlands, Norway and finally Sweden. In the spring of 1941 he moved to Moscow. He became a member of the National Committee for Free Germany. Later he was a teacher at the Central Anti-fascist School in Krasnogorsk.

Return to Germany 
On 1 May 1945 he returned to Germany with Anton Ackermann's group. He was one of the signatories of the programmatic appeal of the Central Committee of the KPD of 11 June 1945. Until 1946 he was the first secretary of the district leadership of Saxony of the KPD. After the unification of the SPD and KPD in the Soviet zone of occupation from 1946 to 1948 together with Karl Litke chairman of the regional association of Greater Berlin of the Socialist Unity Party of Germany (SED). From 1946 to 1950 he was a member of the central secretariat of the party executive, from 21 October 1948 chairman of the Central Party Control Commission (ZPKK) and from 1950 member of the Politburo of the Central Committee of the SED . In the Politburo, he was responsible for controlling the “Traffic Department” of the Central Committee, which was responsible for the secret connections to the KPD in West Germany, which was illegal from 1955, and later to the DKP, and for the financing of these parties. As one of the leading politicians he participated in the Marxist–Leninist orientation of the SED.

From 1949 he was a member of the Provisional People's Chamber, from 1950 to 1954 as vice-president, then as the first deputy of the president and from 1957 to 1960 as chairman of the standing committee for the local representations. He was a member of the National Defense Council of the GDR .

Matern had been a member of the International Federation Resistance of Fighters General Council from 1963 .

Matern was convinced of the SED's claim to leadership. At the 7th All-German Workers' Conference in Leipzig in 1958, he said:“To have state power in your hands is of great importance. [...] We never think of giving up workers' and peasants' power again. We will not allow anyone to run for election who wants to rebuild capitalism. [...] That is why there is no opposition based on bourgeois ideas. "

Matern's urn was buried in the memorial of the socialists in the Zentralfriedhof Friedrichsfelde in Berlin-Lichtenberg.

Awards and honours 

 1953 and 1969 Karl Marx Order
 1955 Patriotic Order of Merit in Gold
 1960 Order of Banner of Labor
 1963 Honorary title Hero of Labor 
 1965 Gold medal for the Patriotic Order of Merit
 1967 Order of the Star of the Friendship of Nations
 1968 Order of Lenin (USSR)
 1968 Order of the Patriotic War II degree (USSR)

The German Post Office of the GDR issued a special stamp on the occasion of his 80th birthday on 13 June 1973.

Many streets, schools and factories bore the name of Matern in the GDR.

The 8th Fighter Squadron of the Air Force of the National People's Army (LSK / LV) in Marxwalde had had his name since 1972, as did the technical school of the Ministry of the Interior of the GDR in Heyrothsberge.

A plaque on the enclosure of Wackerbarth Castle still commemorates the meeting of Soviet politicians and military officials (Anastas Mikoyan and Ivan Konev) with German politicians (Hermann Matern, Kurt Fischer and Rudolf Friedrichs) in May 1945.

Publications 

 Berlin und Deutschland. Reden zu Problemen der Zeit. Berlin, 1947.
 1947 das Jahr größter Entscheidungen. Unsere Aufgaben im neuen Jahr. Rede auf der Funktionärskonferenz der SED am 5. Januar 1947. Berlin 1947.
 Der Weg. Frieden, Freiheit, Wohlstand. Berlin 1948.
 Die Rolle Ernst Thälmanns bei der Schaffung der revolutionären Massenpartei der Arbeiterklasse. Referat a. d. Propagandistenkonferenz d. Abteilung Propaganda beim ZK der SED am 14. und 15. Juli 1951 in Berlin. Berlin 1951.
 Breite Entfaltung von Kritik und Selbstkritik. Diskussionsbeitrag auf der 2. Parteikonferenz der SED, Berlin, 9.–12. Juli 1952. Berlin 1952.
 (Hrsg.): Weissbuch über den Generalkriegsvertrag. Leipzig 1952.
 Über die Durchführung des Beschlusses des ZK der SED „Lehren aus dem Prozess gegen das Verschwörerzentrum Slansky“. 13. Tagung des ZK der SED, 13.-14. Mai 1953. Berlin 1953.
 Die unerschütterliche Einheit und Geschlossenheit der Partei – Quelle ihrer Macht und Siege! Bericht der Zentralen Parteikontrollkommission auf dem IV. Parteitag der SED vom 30. März bis 6. April 1954. Berlin 1954.
 Deutschland in der Periode der Weltwirtschaftskrise 1929–1933. Der Kampf der Kommunistischen Partei Deutschlands um die Aktionseinheit der Arbeiterklasse gegen die Gefahr des Faschismus und des Krieges. Berlin 1956.
 Deutschland in der Periode der relativen Stabilisierung des Kapitalismus 1924–1929. Der Kampf des deutschen Proletariats unter Führung der KPD gegen das Wiedererstarken des deutschen Imperialismus. Berlin 1956.
 Erich Weinert: Das Nationalkomitee Freies Deutschland 1943–1945. Bericht über seine Tätigkeit und seine Auswirkung. Mit einem Geleitwort von Hermann Matern. Rütten & Loening, Berlin 1957.
 Aus dem Leben und Kampf der deutschen Arbeiterbewegung. Dietz, Berlin 1958.
 Der Parteitag der SPD und die Politik der SED zur Herstellung der Aktionseinheit der deutschen Arbeiterklasse im Kampf gegen die atomare Aufrüstung und für die Bildung einer Konföderation beider deutschen Staaten. Berlin 1958.
 Im Kampf für Frieden, Demokratie und Sozialismus. Ausgewählte Reden und Schriften. Berlin 1963

References

1893 births
1971 deaths
Socialist Unity Party of Germany members
Socialist Unity Party of Germany politicians
Communist Party of Germany politicians
Independent Social Democratic Party politicians
International Lenin School alumni
National Committee for a Free Germany members
Members of the Politburo of the Central Committee of the Socialist Unity Party of Germany
Members of the Provisional Volkskammer
Recipients of the Patriotic Order of Merit in gold
Recipients of the Banner of Labor
Recipients of the Order of Lenin
German atheists
Refugees from Nazi Germany in the Soviet Union